Short's Landing Hotel Complex is a historic hotel and farm complex located near Smyrna, Kent County, Delaware. The complex consists of five contributing buildings and one contributing structure. They are the brick hotel (c. 1780), a frame Federal-style mansion house (c. 1800), a small abandoned factory, and an extensive collection of outbuildings including a stable, granaries and storage sheds.  The hotel is a two-story, five bay brick vernacular structure. The frame mansion house has a traditional center-hall, single-pile floor plan.  The frame leadite factory was in operation mainly from the 1920s to the late 1940s.

It was listed on the National Register of Historic Places in 1983.

References

Hotel buildings on the National Register of Historic Places in Delaware
Federal architecture in Delaware
Houses completed in 1780
Houses in Kent County, Delaware
National Register of Historic Places in Kent County, Delaware